SS Augustine B. McManus was a Liberty ship built in the United States during World War II. She was named after Augustine B. McManus, a US Navy officer and a Navy Hydrographic Bureau scientist that had testified at the Titanic disaster trials.

Construction
Augustine B. McManus was laid down on 21 April 1944, under a Maritime Commission (MARCOM) contract, MC hull 2361, by J.A. Jones Construction, Brunswick, Georgia; she was sponsored by Mrs. William J. Harrison, and launched on 10 June 1944.

History
She was allocated to William J. Rountree Company, on 24 June 1944. On 17 December 1945, she was laid up in the National Defense Reserve Fleet in Wilmington, North Carolina. On 27 May 1952, she was laid up in the National Defense Reserve Fleet in the Hudson River Group. On 4 June 1953, she was withdrawn from the fleet to be loaded with grain under the "Grain Program 1953", she returned loaded with grain on 17 June 1953. She was again withdrawn from the fleet on 27 April 1956, to have the grain unloaded, she returned reloaded on 22 May 1956. She was withdrawn from the fleet on 23 May 1963, to have the grain unloaded, she returned empty on 28 May 1963. On 30 September 1970, she was sold to Union Mineral & Alloys Corporation, along with three other ships, for $160,646.16, for scrapping. She was delivered on 18 November 1970.

References

Bibliography

 
 
 
 
 

 

Liberty ships
Ships built in Brunswick, Georgia
1944 ships
Wilmington Reserve Fleet
Hudson River Reserve Fleet
Hudson River Reserve Fleet Grain Program